It Takes Two to Sin in Love (Italian: In amore si pecca in due) is a 1954 Italian melodrama film directed by  Vittorio Cottafavi and starring Giorgio De Lullo, Cosetta Greco and Alda Mangini.

The film's sets were designed by the art director Alfredo Montori.

Cast
 Giorgio De Lullo as Arturo Giorgi 
 Cosetta Greco as Luisa Galli 
 Alda Mangini as Olga 
 Vera Carmi as Bianca Giorgi 
 Carlo Lombardi as Armando Giorgi 
 Cristina Pall as Lolita 
 Rossana Rory as Elvira 
 Germana Paolieri
 Anna Arena
 Fiamma Breschi
 Pina Piovani
 Galeazzo Benti 
 Gianni Agus 
 Mario Siletti 
 Mimmo De Ninno
 Carlo Mariotti 
 Giulio Battiferri 
 Franco Scandurra
 Bruno Smith 
 Antonio Nicotra 
 Enrico Glori 
 Margherita Bossi
 Aldo Vasco 
 Antonio Acqua
 Ermanno Adriani

References

Bibliography 
 Moliterno, Gino. Historical Dictionary of Italian Cinema. Scarecrow Press, 2008.

External links 
 

1954 films
Italian drama films
1954 drama films
1950s Italian-language films
Films directed by Vittorio Cottafavi
Italian black-and-white films
Melodrama films
1950s Italian films